The Whiting reaction is an organic reaction converting a propargyl diol into a diene using lithium aluminium hydride.

This organic reduction has been applied in the synthesis of fecapentaene.

References

 Organic redox reactions

Name reactions